The 1995 New York Giants season was the franchise's 71st season in the National Football League (NFL) and the third under head coach Dan Reeves. The Giants finished in fourth place in the National Football Conference East Division with a 5–11 record, failing to improve on their 9–7 record from 1994.

During one notable game at the end of the season, against the San Diego Chargers, Giants fans threw snowballs onto the field throughout the contest. This action resulted in 15 arrests and the ejection of 175 fans from Giants Stadium; San Diego posted a 27–17 victory in what became known as the "Snowball Game".

Offseason

NFL Draft

1995 Expansion Draft

Transactions 
July 29: The Giants signed Jessie Armstead

Personnel

Staff

Roster

Regular season

Schedule

Standings

References 

New York Giants seasons
New York Giants
New York Giants season
20th century in East Rutherford, New Jersey
Meadowlands Sports Complex